Cape Canaveral Launch Complex 47 (Launch Complex 47, LC-47) is a launch pad for sounding rockets located at the north end of Cape Canaveral Space Force Station, Florida. It is the smallest launch complex at the Space Force Station. The complex features a small blockhouse a few yards from the pad, containing vehicle-specific hardware. Between 1984 and 2008, 531 sounding rockets were launched from pad 47. All weather rocket operations were relocated here from Launch Complex 43 in 1984 in order to make room for the construction of Launch Complex 46. 

The first launch at LC-47 occurred on March 12, 1984, with the flight of a Rocketsonde sounding rocket that reached an apogee of 63km. On October 14, 1991, a student sub-orbital launch on a Super Loki rocket occurred here. As of October 2017, the most recent launch from LC-47 was a Super Loki rocket that reached an apogee of 50km on September 22, 2008.

On November 4, 2004, the 45th Space Wing transferred LC-47 to the Florida Space Authority. While originally slated for deactivation, a licensing agreement under the Commercial Space Transportation Act permitted the continued operation by the Florida Space Authority.

References

Cape Canaveral Space Force Station
Launch complexes of the United States Space Force
1984 establishments in Florida